"Tourist Attraction" is an episode of the original The Outer Limits television show. It first aired on 23 December 1963, during the first season.

Plot
Domineering millionaire John Dexter drives a group of explorers and scientists to pursue an ancient lake monster that is reputed to live in the waters of a South American dictatorship. Using underwater detection equipment aboard Dexter's yacht, the creature is spotted swimming along the lake bed. After several attempts, the creature is captured and taken to the local university for study.

The creature is immobilized and stored inside a freezer to aid in its preservation while out of water. Meanwhile, Dexter makes plans to transport it to the United States to place it on display. San Blas' absolute ruler, Juan Mercurio, has his own plans to use it to attract tourists to his country's faltering World's Fair, claiming the animal as a national treasure. During its captivity, the creature is revived due to an inept guard's negligence, and emits ultrasonic waves that cause the freezer door to implode. It is recaptured before it can fully escape its confines, and an armed guard from Mercurio's palace is ordered to stand watch. Dexter overpowers him, and arranges for the creature's transport on his private plane back to the States.

As Dexter and his assistants prepare the monster for its trip, they are shocked to see more of the creatures emerging from the lake. A marine biologist, previously employed by Dexter, urges them to turn the creature loose. Reluctantly, they comply, watching as it joins the others. Dexter, shooting at the creatures in an effort to stop them, is abruptly halted by a piercing, ultrasonic pulse. The creatures crawl back into the lake and disappear under the water. With the combined energy of their earth-shattering sound waves, the creatures topple the dam created by Mercurio during his reign of power, killing him, and flooding San Blas, destroying all that he had built.

Opening narration
"In Man's dark and troubled history, there are vestiges of strange gods. This stone statue was, once, such a god a thousand years gone by in the central mountains of Pan America. Today, new gods have emerged – the god of power, the god of money. The Republic of San Blas lies west of the Orinoco Basin, slightly north of the Equator. Its principle exports are coffee, copra, mahogany, maize and saffron. In a hundred odd years, the reigns of government have changed many times; in blood, and fire, and death. The last of these revolutionaries was led by Juan Mercurio – the most absolute and powerful ruler of them all. Only the Indians who live close to the old gods in the volcanic uplands are unimpressed. They have seen the coming of the Conquistadors, with the power of their guns and flashing flags...the Revolutionaries, with the power of their zeal and their willingness to die...the Americans, with the power of their money, and bulldozers; with their summer houseboats in the crater lake of Ari Pana; with their gadgets, and machines, and devices..."

Act I narration
"Moving through the deep, protected only by a tank of air and a hunting spear, the scientist/explorer descends beyond the San Blas shelf; but, all unknown to him, the observer is, himself, observed. Hidden in the sinuous rills of seaweed, sightless eyes, blind for centuries, stare out of the abyss. The legendary creature of the deep, sensing through neuro-receptors in its skin, becomes aware of the alien invader – Man..."

Act IV narration
"Stressed and strained by constant drilling of ultrasonic beams, the concrete face of the dam cracks and falls. Ten million tons of pressure build towards ultimate collapse..."

Closing narration
"The forces of nature will not submit to injustice. No man has the right, nor will the checks and balances of the universe permit him, to place his fellows under the harsh yoke of repression. Nor may he, again, place the forces of nature under the triple-yoke of vanity, greed and ambition. In the words of Shelley, 'Here lies your tyrant who would rule the world, immortal.'"

Background
 Unlike the other episodes, this one has two additional narrations, one during Act I and another in Act IV.
 This episode was originally scheduled to air on November 25, 1963, two days after the assassination of John F. Kennedy.  As happened with almost all regularly scheduled US network programming in the days following the Kennedy assassination, this episode was postponed.  However, rather than move it to the following week of December 2 (when new episodes of The Outer Limits resumed broadcasting), "Tourist Attraction" was bumped back several weeks, to December 23.

Cast

External links

The Outer Limits (1963 TV series season 1) episodes
1963 American television episodes